Dr. I Gusti Putu Phalgunadi was an Indonesian scholar who has translated many of Indonesian scriptures from the Kawi language to English.  Born on 3 January 1948 at Denpasar, Bali, he died on September 24, 2014 and his funeral was held on October 1, 2014. The topic of his thesis was: Tambang Badung Temple at a Glance.
In 1978 he won a scholarship to pursue his research work in India. For his research purposes, he has traveled throughout India particularly the historical and holy places. He had visited most of the Capitals of States in India except the North-east States.
Since a decade he has been moving between Delhi-Bodhgaya-Haridar in search of his mission. He is awarded scholarships by many private institutes as well as the Government of India.

1978-79 Scholarship from International Academy of Indian Culture, New Delhi

1979-81 General Culture Scholarship Scheme from Government of India

1981-88 General Culture Scholarship Scheme from Government of India

1985-88 Senior Scholarship Holder from Indian Council of Historical Research, New Delhi.

Mahabharata 
Of the eighteen parvas, only eight Kawi manuscripts remain.
 Vol 1: Adi Parva - The First Book, 305 pages, 1990, 
 Vol 2: Virata parva - The Fourth Book, 197 pages, 1992, 
 Vol 3: Udyoga parva, 345 pages, 1994, 
 Vol 4: Bhishma parva, 283 pages, 1995, 
 Vol 5: Asramavasa parva, Mosala parva, Prasthanika parva, Svargarohanaparva, 161 pages, 1997,

Ramayana 
Indonesian Ramayana : The Uttarakanda - 240 pages, 1999,

Others 
 The Indonesian Brahmanda purana - 349 pages, 2000, 
 Evolution of Hindu Culture in Bali - 194 pages, 1991,  (81-85067-65-1)
 The Pararaton - 164 pages, 2002,  (81-85067-97-X)
 Fundamental Dictionary Of Balinese Language And Culture - 1995
 Tambang Badung Temple at a Glance
 Bali Embraces Hinduism - 2005

References

1948 births
2014 deaths
Translators to English
Indonesian translators
Indonesian Hindus
Balinese people
20th-century translators